United Calabarzon Collegiate League (UCCL) (now United Collegiate Championship League) is a collegiate sporting league exclusive for colleges and universities based in the Calabarzon region comprising Cavite, Laguna, Batangas, Rizal (although, no schools were represented) and Quezon. The UCCL established in 2007 as the North Batangas Open League. Among the sports who are included in the league are basketball, volleyball, beach volleyball, football, and chess.

Notable Schools
San Pablo Colleges Ravens
First Asia Institute of Technology and Humanities Bravehearts
Philippine Christian University - Dasmarinas Dolphins
San Pedro College of Business Administration Tigers 
Calayan Educational Foundation, Inc. Cougars 
Lyceum of the Philippines University - Laguna Pirates
College of Sciences Technology and Communications, Inc. Stallions
Emilio Aguinaldo College - Cavite Vanguards
University of Batangas - Lipa City Brahmans
De La Salle Lipa Stallions
University of Perpetual Help System Laguna Saints

See also
United Central Luzon Athletic Association
CESAFI

References

2007 establishments in the Philippines
Student sport in the Philippines
Sports organizations established in 2007